San Terenzo is a village (frazione) in the comune of Lerici in the province of La Spezia.

Italian Riviera
Frazioni of the Province of La Spezia